Rondeletiola minor, also known as the lentil bobtail, is a species of bobtail squid native to the eastern Atlantic Ocean and Mediterranean Sea. Its natural range covers the northwest of Spain, Portugal, and the eastern, central and western Mediterranean Sea (including the Ligurian Sea, northern and southern Tyrrhenian Sea, Strait of Sicily, Gulf of Taranto,
Adriatic Sea, north Aegean Sea, Sea of Marmara, and Levantine Sea) to the southeastern Atlantic Benguela Current off Namibia.

R. minor grows to a mantle length (ML) of 23 mm.

The type specimen was collected in the Tyrrhenian Sea and is deposited at the Stazione Zoologica in Naples.

References

External links 

Bobtail squid
Molluscs of the Atlantic Ocean
Molluscs of the Mediterranean Sea
Marine molluscs of Africa
Marine molluscs of Europe
Molluscs described in 1912
Taxa named by Adolf Naef
Cephalopods of Europe